Trithorax-group proteins (TrxG) are a heterogeneous collection of proteins whose main action is to maintain gene expression. They can be categorized into three general classes based on molecular function:
 histone-modifying TrxG proteins
 chromatin-remodeling TrxG proteins
 DNA-binding TrxG proteins, 
plus other TrxG proteins not categorized in the first three classes.

Discovery 

The founding member of TrxG proteins, trithorax (trx), was discovered ~1978 by Philip Ingham as part of his doctoral thesis while a graduate student in the laboratory of J.R.S. Whittle at the University of Sussex. Histone-lysine N-methyltransferase 2A is the human homolog of trx.

The table contains names of Drosophila TrxG members. Homologs in other species may have different names.

Function 

Trithorax-group proteins typically function in large complexes formed with other proteins. The complexes formed by TrxG proteins are divided into two groups: 
histone-modifying complexes and ATP-dependent chromatin-remodeling complexes. The main function of TrxG proteins, along with polycomb group (PcG) proteins, is regulating gene expression. Whereas PcG proteins are typically associated with gene silencing, TrxG proteins are most commonly linked to gene activation. The trithorax complex activates gene transcription by inducing trimethylation of lysine 4 of histone H3 (H3K4me3) at specific sites in chromatin recognized by the complex. Ash1 domain is involved in H3K36 methylation. Trithorax complex also interacts with CBP (CREB binding protein) which is an acetyltransferase to acetylate H3K27. This gene activation is reinforced by acetylation of histone H4. The actions of TrxG proteins are often described as 'antagonistic' of PcG proteins function. Aside from gene regulation, evidence suggests TrxG proteins are also involved in other processes including apoptosis, cancer, and stress responses.

Role in development 

During development, TrxG proteins maintain activation of required genes, particularly the Hox genes, after maternal factors are depleted. This is accomplished by preserving the epigenetic marks, specifically H3K4me3, established by maternally-supplied factors. TrxG proteins are also implicated in X-chromosome inactivation, which occurs during early embryogenesis.  it is unclear whether TrxG activity is required in every cell during the entire development of an organism or only during certain stages in certain cell types.

See also 
 HIstome 
 Histone acetyltransferase
 Histone deacetylases 
 Histone methyltransferase
 Histone-Modifying Enzymes
 Nucleosome 
 PRMT4 pathway

References

External links 
 The Polycomb and Trithorax page of the Cavalli lab This page contains useful information on Polycomb and trithorax proteins, in the form of an introduction, links to published reviews, list of Polycomb and trithorax proteins, illustrative power point slides and a link to a genome browser showing the genome-wide distribution of these proteins in Drosophila melanogaster.
 The Interactive Fly – Society for Developmental Biology

DNA-binding proteins
Molecular genetics
Drosophila melanogaster genes